Oëlleville is a commune in the Vosges department in Grand Est in northeastern France.

Inhabitants are called Oëllevillois.

Geography
Over 12% of the commune land is forested.

Tradition
The village makes a particular feature of the feast of St Nicholas on December 6.  Each year a member of the community, chosen for his imposing physique and the steely firmness of his eyes, is selected to dress up as The Saint, who is accompanied by Père Fouettard (better known to some English speakers as Hans Trapp in Alsace or Zwarte Piet in Flanders) with his own bag of less welcome seasonal gifts.  A procession and other seasonal gift related celebrations and rituals ensue.

See also
Communes of the Vosges department

References

Communes of Vosges (department)